The 2016–17 season of the Belgian First Division A was the 114th season of top-tier football in Belgium and the first following the structural changes in the Belgian football pyramid, reducing the number of professional teams to 24. It began on 29 July 2016 and finished on 31 May 2017. The fixtures were announced on 8 June 2016. Club Brugge were the defending champions but had to settle for second place with Anderlecht taking their 34th title.

Team changes

 OH Leuven was relegated after finishing last in the 2015–16 Belgian Pro League.
 Due to the fact that 2015–16 Belgian Second Division champions WS Brussels were refused a Belgian professional football license, Eupen was promoted as runner-up instead.

Teams

Stadiums and locations

Personnel and kits

Managerial changes

Regular season

League table

Results

Championship play-offs
The points obtained during the regular season were halved (and rounded up) before the start of the playoff. As a result, the teams started with the following points before the playoff: Anderlecht 31 points, Club Brugge 30, Zulte Waregem 27, Gent 25, Oostende 25 and Charleroi 25. The points of Anderlecht, Club Brugge and Charleroi were rounded up, therefore in case of any ties on points at the end of the playoffs, the half point would have been deducted for these teams.

League table

Europa League play-offs
Group A of the play-offs consisted of the teams finishing in positions 7, 9, 12 and 14 during the regular season and the first and third placed team in the qualifying positions in the 2016–17 Belgian First Division B. The teams finishing in positions 8, 10, 11, 13 and 15 joined the second placed qualifier from the 2016–17 Belgian First Division B to form group B.

Group A

Group B

Semi-final
The winners of both play-off groups competed in one match to play the fourth-placed or fifth-placed team of the championship play-offs for a spot in the final. This match was played on the field of the highest ranked team in the regular competition. The winner of the semi-final advanced to the final to play for a spot in the third qualifying round of the 2017–18 UEFA Europa League.

Final
The winner of the Europa League play-off semi-final and the fourth-placed team played one match to determine the Europa League play-off winner. KV Oostende qualified for the third qualifying round of the 2017–18 UEFA Europa League, where they were eliminated by Olympique Marseille.

Season statistics

Top scorers

Top assists

Clean sheets

Number of teams by provinces

Attendances
Football clubs with an average home attendance of at least 10,000:

References

Belgian Pro League seasons
Belgian
1